Lawrence Bright (1847-14 November 1908) was an architect based in Nottingham.

History

He was born in 1847, and educated at the Nottingham School of Art. He married Hannah Lee, daughter of Mr. C.J. Lee of Spilsby, on 22 June 1870 at Derby Road Baptist Church, and later went into partnership with his son, Lawrence Lee Bright.

He was a prominent member of the Derby Road Baptist Church. He died at 8 Third-avenue, Sherwood Rise on 14 November 1908 and left an estate of £33,914 to his widow Hannah Bright, and his son, Lawrence Lee Bright.

Works
1 to 3, Bridlesmith Gate, Nottingham 1873-75
Old Angel public house, Stoney Street, Nottingham 1878 additions
Rutland Chambers, St Peter’s Gate, Nottingham 1888
Railway Mission Hall, Traffic Street, Nottingham 1893-94 
Boulevard Works, Hartley Road, Nottingham 1896 additions
Shops and offices, Heathcote Street, Nottingham 1898-99
Board School, Kirkby in Ashfield, 1900 extension
Co-operative Stores, Kirkby in Ashfield 1900 
Barclays Bank, Raleigh Street/Alfreton Road, Nottingham 1902
Midland Counties District Bank, Arkwright Street, Nottingham 1902
Lenton Hall, University Park, Nottingham 1905 remodelling
4 houses, 2-8 Harcourt Street, Beeston, Nottingham 1905
Warehouse, Queen’s Bridge Road/Traffic Street, Nottingham 1905-06
Houses on Huntingdon Drive, The Park Estate, Nottingham 1906-08

References

19th-century English architects
Architects from Nottingham
Alumni of Nottingham School of Art